The following is a list of notable events and releases of the year 2011 in Swedish music.

Events

January

February

March
 12 – Eric Saade wins Melodifestivalen 2011 with his entry "Popular", he will represent Sweden in the Eurovision Song Contest 2011 in Düsseldorf, Germany.

April
 6 – Per Wiberg quits Opeth.

May
 12 – Eric Saade wins the second semi-final in the Eurovision Song Contest 2011 in Düsseldorf, Germany.
 14 – Eric Saade comes third in the final of the Eurovision Song Contest 2011, Sweden best placement since 1999 when Sweden won.
 18
 Lady Gaga releases her new CD Born This Way Exclusively on the Swedish Music Streaming Program Spotify
 Adrian Lux signs with Universal Music Sweden.

June
 8 – The 19th Sweden Rock Festival started in Norje (June 8 – 11).
 28 – The Where The Action Is festival started in Gothenburg.

July
 9 – Sonisphere In Globe Arena Stockholm.
 28 – Storsjöyran in Östersund (July 28 – 30).

August
 11 – Way Out West City festival in Gothenburg (August 11 – 13).

Albums released

January
 11 – Öga, Näsa, Mun Single by Dungen (Third Man Records).

February
 February 11 – Charm School is released which is Roxette's first album with new material since 2001's Room Service 
 February 14 – Love CPR by September (singer) is released
 February 23 – Carl Norén from Sugar Plum Fairy releases his solo debut album Owls.
 February 23 – Thomas Di Leva releases his album Hjärtat vinner alltid  
 February 28 – Mohombi releases his Debut album MoveMeant (various dates in Europe) 
 February 28 – Roxette start its Charm School World Tour in Kazan, Rusia in front of 8.000 people. The tour will include all continents, including dates in the United States

March
 Mars 2 – Lykke Li releases her second album Wounded Rhymes
 Mars 9 – Swingfly releases Awesomeness – An Introduction to Swingfly 
 Mars 11 – Danny Saucedo Releases In The Club 
 Mars 15 – Bob Hund releases Det Överexponerade Gömstället 
 16
Miss Li releases – Beats & Bruises 
Unseen by The Haunted
 Mars 23 – Erik Hassle releases Mariefred Sessions
29 – Surtur Rising by Amon Amarth

April
 April 13
Kikki Danielsson releases "Första dagen på resten av mitt liv".
Adam Tensta releases Scared Of The Dark
 April 15 – Performocracy by The Poodles is released 
 15
Newkid releases Alexander JR Ferrer 
The Unseen Empire by Scar Symmetry
 April 16 – Eva Eastwood – Lyckost 
 April 27 – Veronica Maggio Releases her third and highly anticipated album Satan i Gatan

May
30 – Khaos Legions by Arch Enemy

June
 June 8 – Timbuktu releases his eight album Sagolandet 
 June 15 – In Flames release their tenth album Sounds of a Playground Fading
 June 29 – Eric Saade releases his second solo album Saade with the Eurovision song contest entry as lead single.

July
 July 27 – Takida will release their album. Title yet to be announced, but The Burning heart has been circulating.

September
16 – Heritage by Opeth
23 – Hell in Reverse by Last View

November
7 – For Funerals to Come... (reissue) by Katatonia

Unknown date
#

A

Agnes Carlsson TBA 

E

Europe (band) – TBA 

E-Type – TBA 

G

Gathania – TBA, Swedish IDOL contestant 2007 was reported working on material for 2011

New Artists
 Eric Amarillo – Swedish singer from Gothenburg SwEric Amarillo, musician, producer and DJ part of the duo The Attic with Michael Feiner 
 Newkid – Swedish singer from Stockholm released debut album

References

 
Swedish music by year
Swedish
Musc